The 2003–04 Romanian Hockey League season was the 74th season of the Romanian Hockey League. Five teams participated in the league, and SC Miecurea Ciuc won the championship.

Regular season

Playoffs

3rd place
Progym Gheorgheni - Dinamo Bucharest (5-3, 4-2, 6-4)

Final
SC Miercurea Ciuc - CSA Steaua Bucuresti (5-3, 5-2, 6-1)

External links
Season on hockeyarchives.info

Romanian Hockey League seasons
Romanian
Rom